The Girassol Oil Field is an oil field located in the Atlantic Ocean. It was discovered in 1996 and developed by Total. The oil field is operated and owned by TotalEnergies SE.

References 

Oil fields of Angola